Arran Rewi Brett Pene (born 26 October 1967) is a former New Zealand rugby union player. A number 8, Pene represented Otago at a provincial level, and was a member of the New Zealand national side, the All Blacks, from 1992 to 1994. He played 26 matches for the All Blacks including 15 internationals.

References

1967 births
Living people
Rugby union players from Hamilton, New Zealand
Otago rugby union players
New Zealand rugby union players
New Zealand international rugby union players
Māori All Blacks players
Barbarian F.C. players
Rugby union number eights